Gunu may refer to:

 Abdul-Samed Muhamed Gunu (born 1966), Ghanaian politician
 Gunu language, spoken in Cameroon
 Sherifa Gunu, Ghanaian musician